The 1971 Cornell Big Red football team represented Cornell University in the 1971 NCAA University Division football season as a member of the Ivy League. The Big Red were led by sixth-year head coach Jack Musick and played their home games at Schoellkopf Field. The Big Red finished the season 8–1 overall and 6–1 in Ivy League play to win Cornell's first-ever Ivy League championship, sharing the title with Dartmouth, the only team to defeat the 1971 Big Red.

The team was led offensively by future NFL running back Ed Marinaro; during the 1971 season, Marinaro capped his college football career by setting a national collegiate record for career rushing yards at 4,715, which stood until being broken in 1976 by Tony Dorsett of the Pittsburgh Panthers. Marinaro won first team All-American honors and finished in a close second in voting for the Heisman Trophy. On October 30, 1971, Cornell saw its largest home football crowd in the post-1970 era with 23,000 in attendance at Schoellkopf Field (which had a capacity of 25,597) for the day's rivalry match-up against Columbia.

Schedule

Roster

References

External links
 Cornell vs. Harvard (Oct. 16, 1971)  game footage from the Harvard Video Archive

Cornell
Cornell Big Red football seasons
Ivy League football champion seasons
Cornell Big Red football